This is a list of episodes from the YTV animated series Numb Chucks. The series first premiered on January 7, 2014 on YTV in Canada. It has been acquired by Cartoon Network in the United States and was planned to air on the channel but ended up airing on Boomerang.  On June 9, 2014, the series was renewed for a second season, which began airing on March 17, 2015.

Series overview
{| class="wikitable" style="text-align:center"
|-
! style="padding:0 8px;" colspan="2" rowspan="2"| Season
! style="padding:0 8px;" rowspan="2"| Episodes
! style="padding:0 80px;" colspan="2"| Original air date
|-
! First aired
! Last aired
|-
|  style="background:#FFA700;"| 
| style="text-align:center;"| [[List of Numb Chucks episodes#Season 1 (2014)|1]]
| style="text-align:center;"| 26
| style="text-align:center;"| 
| style="text-align:center;"| 
|- 
|  style="background:#f6d555;"| 
| style="text-align:center;"| [[List of Numb Chucks episodes#Season 2 (2015–16)|2]]
| style="text-align:center;"| 26
| style="text-align:center;"| 
| style="text-align:center;"|   
|}

Episodes

Season 1 (2014)

Season 2 (2015–16)

References

Lists of Canadian children's animated television series episodes